Robert Emmett "Red Bob" Harmon (1882 – 1959) was an American football, basketball, and baseball coach. He served as the head football coach at Illinois College in 1903 and 1917, Loyola University Chicago in 1911, Gonzaga University from 1913 to 1914, the University Farm—now known as the University of California, Davis—from 1915 to 1916, and the University of Santa Clara—now known as Santa Clara University—from 1919 to 1920, and at Quincy College and Seminary—now known as Quincy University—in Quincy, Illinois from 1922 to 1924.

Coaching career
Harmon was the head coach for the Gonzaga Bulldogs men's basketball team from 1913 to 1915. He recorded a 10–4 (.714) record during his two seasons.

In 1917, Harmon returned to his alma mater, Illinois College in Jacksonville, Illinois, to become head football coach, succeeding his brother, William T. Harmon, who was serving as a captain in the United States Army at Camp Grant near Rockford, Illinois.

Law career
Harmon was a graduate of the Loyola University Chicago School of Law and did graduate work at the University of Chicago and the University of Michigan. While he was coaching at Gonzaga, Harmon also practiced law with the offices of Luby and Pierson. At Santa Clara, he taught law as a member of the faculty. In 1930, Harmon passed the Illinois state bar and began a law practice in Jacksonville, Illinois.

Head coaching record

Football

References

External links
 

1882 births
1959 deaths
Basketball coaches from Illinois
Creighton Bluejays football players
Denver Pioneers football players
Gonzaga Bulldogs athletic directors
Gonzaga Bulldogs baseball coaches
Gonzaga Bulldogs football coaches
Gonzaga Bulldogs men's basketball coaches
Illinois College Blueboys baseball players
Illinois College Blueboys football coaches
Illinois College Blueboys football players
Loyola Ramblers football coaches
Quincy Hawks baseball coaches
Quincy Hawks football coaches
Santa Clara Broncos baseball coaches
Santa Clara Broncos football coaches
Santa Clara Broncos men's basketball coaches
UC Davis Aggies football coaches
High school football coaches in Montana
Loyola University Chicago School of Law alumni
Santa Clara University faculty
Sportspeople from Jacksonville, Illinois
Illinois lawyers
Washington (state) lawyers
20th-century American lawyers